is a mountain in the city of Kashihara, in the central-western part Nara Prefecture, Japan. Together with Mount Amanokagu and Mount Miminashi, it belongs to the so-called "Yamato Sanzan", in which it is the highest. At the foot of the mountain are gneiss new rocks, and part of the middle slope and higher are biotite and andesite. At the top is a funnel of an extinct crater.

References

External links

Mountains of Nara Prefecture
Mountains under 1000 metres